WTRX (1330 AM, "Sports XTRA 1330") is an American radio station broadcasting a sports format in Flint, Michigan. It is the Flint affiliate for  Michigan Wolverines football and men's basketball, and CBS Sports Radio. Its studios are located in Mundy Township near U.S. 23 and Hill Rd. and its transmitter is in Burton near Dort Hwy. and Bristol Rd.

History
The station began broadcasting October 13, 1947, under the WBBC call sign. It was owned by Booth Radio Stations, Incorporated and was a Mutual affiliate. WBBC was also briefly a CBS Radio affiliate in 1959, after WJR in Detroit briefly dropped its CBS affiliation to become an independent. In 1960, WBBC was purchased by Robert E. Eastman, who changed the call letters to WTRX and installed a Top 40 format to compete with WTAC. By early 1968, the station had evolved into an adult contemporary (or "bright MOR" as then-station manager Johnny Nogaj described it in Billboard magazine) format, which would last for the next 21 years. During this time, the station was also an affiliate of American Top 40, until 1986 when the show moved to Saginaw-based WIOG on its new 102.5 mhz frequency.

In 1989, the station was auctioned at Flint Hyatt Regency where David Lee Shure a Flint area businessman won the bid on the station and property. Days after the paperwork was filed it became an affiliate of Satellite Music Network's Z-Rock format as WDLZ.  The station subsequently failed, largely due to the downward spiral in the local economy and the migration of many AM stations in the area to non-music formats.

After a period of silence after WDLZ went off the air in 1990, WTRX came back on the air with its legendary call sign restored, but with no original programming.  WTRX spent the first few years simulcasting Bay City station WMAX (AM)'s all-sports format until it established its own all-sports programming.  The station became what it is today in 1996.

In 2001, WTRX's studio was moved from its transmitter location on Bristol Road in Burton to the studios and offices of co-owned WFBE on Miller Road in Flint Township.

Cumulus Media purchased WTRX in 2011.  It relocated its studios and offices to 6317 Taylor Drive in Mundy Township on March 2012.  In addition to its Flint sister stations mentioned on the infobox, WTRX's other sister stations in the Flint/Tri-Cities area are WHNN, WIOG, WKQZ and WILZ, all licensed to the Tri-Cities; of the four, only WHNN and WIOG also cover the Flint area under normal listening conditions.

References

External links

Michiguide.com - WTRX History

TRX
Cumulus Media radio stations
Radio stations established in 1947
CBS Sports Radio stations
1947 establishments in Michigan